Belke is a surname of German origin. Notable people with the surname include:

Brent Belke (born 1965), Canadian guitarist and composer 
Marc Belke (born 1965), Canadian musician and radio personality

References

Surnames of German origin